Upper Solaiyar or Upper Sholayar Dam is located  from Valparai, a hill station in the Anaimalai Hills of the Coimbatore district, Tamil Nadu India. As it is a  part of the hydroelectric project of Tamil Nadu, special permission is required to visit the dam.

The nearest railway station is Pollachi.

The reservoir's overflowing waters are let into the Parambikulam Reservoir through the saddle dam.

It was constructed by a team working under K. Gopalswamy Mudhaliar, the most popular engineer in that area.

The Solaiyar Dam is part of the Solaiyar Hydroelectric Project (HEP). The project comprises the main Soliayar Dam, the Solaiyar Flanking, and the Solaiyar Saddle Dam.

History
Solaiyar Dam was officially opened in 1965; the Solaiyar Flanking was built in 1964 and the Solaiyar Saddle Dam in 1965.

Construction
The area of the reservoir is 8.705 square km. The height of the main dam is 66 metres, its width is 430 metres, and length 430.60 metres. The Solaiyar Flanking has a height of 28 metres and width of 19 metres. The Solaiyar Saddle Dam is 259 metres high and 109 metres wide.

See also 
 List of dams and reservoirs in India
 Aliyar Reservoir

References 

Dams in Tamil Nadu
Coimbatore district
1965 establishments in Madras State
Energy infrastructure completed in 1965
20th-century architecture in India